Jasmine rice is a long-grain variety of fragrant rice (also known as aromatic rice). Its fragrance, reminiscent of pandan (Pandanus amaryllifolius) and popcorn, results from the rice plant's natural production of aroma compounds, of which 2-acetyl-1-pyrroline is the most salient. A rapid loss of aromatic intensity leads many Southeast Asians and connoisseurs to prefer each year's freshly harvested "new crop" of jasmine rice. Jasmine rice is a variety of Oryza sativa.

Jasmine rice is grown primarily in Thailand (Thai hom mali or Thai fragrant rice), Cambodia (phka rumduol or Cambodian jasmine rice), Laos, and southern Vietnam. It is moist and soft in texture when cooked, with a slightly sweet flavor. The grains cling and are somewhat sticky when cooked, though less sticky than glutinous rice (Oryza sativa var. glutinosa), as it has less amylopectin. It is about three times stickier than American long-grain rice.

To harvest jasmine rice, the long stalks are cut and threshed. The rice can then be left in a hulled form called paddy rice, de-hulled to produce brown rice, or milled to remove the germ and some or all of the bran, producing white rice.

Origin
The origin of Jasmine rice can be traced back to Ban Laem Pradu in Phanat Nikhom District, Chonburi Province where the original Khao DawkMali rice was discovered. The rice sample, known as "Sample 105," was selected for its slender, jasmine-white long grain and natural fragrance similar to pandanus leaf and was brought to Bang Khla District, Chachoengsao Province in mid-1940s to early 1950s. Eventually, the rice was officially named Khao Dawk Mali 105, which is often shortened to "Khao Hom Mali" or simply "Hom Mali", and is now grown primarily in the Northeast region of Thailand, specifically in Thung Kula Rong Hai.

Types 
Thai jasmine rice and Cambodian rice share many of the same characteristics and grow mainly in neighboring geographic areas on opposite sides of the northeastern Thai-Cambodian border. Cambodian jasmine rice is cultivated in Cambodia and processed as white (milled and polished) and brown rice. Distinct Cambodian jasmine rice varieties include these three, phka rumduol, phka romeat, and phka rumdeng. Recent DNA fingerprint analysis, carried out with 18 markers, shows that all three varieties possess 18 known fragrance alleles. Two varietals (phka rumduol and phka rumdeng) are distinctly Cambodian with 17 markers in identical positions, with Thai jasmine rice and one fragrance marker each in a different position. The analysis of Cambodian phka romeat shows all 18 markers in identical positions with the trademarked Thai jasmine rice Thai hom mali.

Jasmine rice, though grown in Laos and southern Vietnam, is not the predominant rice variety. Glutinous rice is grown in Laos, and regular Oryza sativa predominates in Vietnam.

Thai jasmine rice from Thailand has a slender shape. The two types of Thai jasmine rice are white and brown. The vast majority of jasmine rice exported overseas to North America and Europe is Thai jasmine rice, with a small minority from Vietnam. In Thailand it is thought that only Surin, Buriram, and Sisaket Provinces can produce high quality hom mali.

White jasmine rice 
When cooked, white jasmine rice has a dry texture. The aroma is caused by the evaporation of 2-acetyl-1-pyrroline.

Brown jasmine rice 
Brown jasmine rice retains the light tan outer layer on the rice grain. It has greater health benefits than white jasmine rice because it still has the bran. Brown jasmine rice has a flavor like oats and contains gamma oryzanol which can decrease cholesterol in blood vessels. Brown jasmine rice has vitamins such as vitamin A, vitamin B, and beta-carotene and it contains antioxidants which support the working of the nervous system.

Glycemic index 
Jasmine rice has a glycemic index of 68–80. Foods with a glycemic index of 55 or lower are preferred in the diet of diabetics due to their slower absorption which prevents large spikes in blood sugar after consumption. Not all rice has a high glycemic index. Basmati rice, for example, has a relatively low glycemic index of 59. However, it is uncommon for rice to be eaten alone. It is usually eaten with other foods that can reduce its glycemic index by 20–40 percent.

Culinary uses 
Steamed jasmine rice is ideal for eating with stir fries, with grilled, fried, or braised food items, and in soups (when cooked slightly drier by adding a little less water during cooking).

Recognition 
At the 2017 World Rice Conference held in Macau, Thailand's hom mali 105 (jasmine) rice was declared the world's best rice, beating 21 competitors. Thailand had entered three rice varieties in the competition. This marked the fifth time in the prior nine years that Thai jasmine rice has won the honour. The judges of the competition were chefs from Macau restaurants. Criteria were taste and the shape of the rice grains. Cambodia finished second, Vietnam third.

See also 

 Ambemohar
 Basmati rice
 Glutinous rice
 List of rice varieties
 Oryza sativa
 Riceberry: A Thai rice variety that is a cross-breed of Jao Hom Nin and Khao Dok Mali 105
 Thung Kula Ronghai: Well-known Thai Hom Mali growing region
 Wehani rice

References 

1.

External links 
 

Rice varieties
Thai cuisine
Cultivars originating in Thailand